Island council elections were held in the Caribbean Netherlands on 2 March 2011 to elect the members of the island councils of Bonaire, Saba and Sint Eustatius. They were the first island council elections since the dissolution of the Netherlands Antilles in 2010.

The elections were held on the same day as the provincial elections in the European Netherlands. The election was won by the Bonaire Patriotic Union (4 seats) in Bonaire, the Windward Islands People's Movement (4 seats) in Saba, and the Democratic Party (2 seats) in Sint Eustatius.

Results

Bonaire

Saba

Sint Eustatius

References

Dutch
Island council
March 2011 events in North America
2011 in Bonaire
Elections in Bonaire
Elections in Saba (island)
Elections in Sint Eustatius